is a Japanese politician and former speed skater. He won an Olympic bronze medal in 1994, and also competed in the 1998 and 2002 Olympics. He ended his speed skating career in 2002.

Horii represents Noboribetsu in the Hokkaido prefectural assembly for the Liberal Democratic Party of Japan (LDP) since 2007. In the 2012 general election of the House of Representatives, he stands as LDP candidate in Hokkaido 9th district seeking to succeed retiring Democrat Yukio Hatoyama. He was nominated in July 2012 when Hatoyama was still expected to run for re-election.

World records 

Source: SpeedSkatingStats.com

References 

 Manabu Horii at SpeedSkatingStats.com
 Official site, Profile

External links
 
 
 

1972 births
Living people
Japanese male speed skaters
Olympic speed skaters of Japan
Olympic bronze medalists for Japan
Olympic medalists in speed skating
Speed skaters at the 1994 Winter Olympics
Speed skaters at the 1998 Winter Olympics
Speed skaters at the 2002 Winter Olympics
Medalists at the 1994 Winter Olympics
World record setters in speed skating
Liberal Democratic Party (Japan) politicians
Japanese sportsperson-politicians
Sportspeople from Hokkaido
Politicians from Hokkaido
Members of the Hokkaido Prefectural Assembly
People from Muroran, Hokkaido
World Single Distances Speed Skating Championships medalists
World Sprint Speed Skating Championships medalists